The 92nd edition of the Liège–Bastogne–Liège cycling classic was held on April 23, and stretched 262 km. The race was won by Spanish all-rounder Alejandro Valverde of the Illes Balears cycling team.

Results

External links
Cyclingnews.com race page

2006
2006 UCI ProTour
2006 in Belgian sport